Carpinus putoensis (Putuo hornbeam) is a species of plant in the family Betulaceae.

It is endemic to Zhoushan archipelago in China where it survives as a single tree on Putuo Island. It is monoecious, thereby in principle still able to reproduce sexually in the wild. According to Edward O. Wilson, this is an example of what conservation biologists call "living dead" species.

References

Further reading
 Wilson, Edward O. The Future of Life. Vintage Books, New York: 2002. p. 89

Endemic flora of China
Trees of China
Critically endangered plants
putoensis
Flora of Zhejiang
Endlings
Taxonomy articles created by Polbot